Albertina Marie Majorino (born February 7, 1985) is an American film and television actress. She started her career as a child actor, starring in films such as Andre, When a Man Loves a Woman, Waterworld, and Corrina, Corrina.

After her early success as a child actor, she returned to acting at age 18 as the character Deb in the 2004 film Napoleon Dynamite. From 2004 to 2007, she portrayed Cindy "Mac" Mackenzie on Veronica Mars, and reprised the character in the 2014 spinoff film; she was offered the chance to play the character once again in the eight-episode fourth season in 2019, but turned it down. She has also appeared in the TV series Big Love, True Blood and Grey's Anatomy. She has played the part of Maggie Harris on the television series Legends. She later appeared in the recurring role of Florence in the television series Scorpion.

Early life
Majorino was born in the Westlake neighborhood of Los Angeles, California, to Sarah and Bob Majorino. She has Italian ancestry on her paternal side. Majorino has an older brother, Kevin, with whom she has formed a rock band, The AM Project.

Career
Majorino began her acting career in a 1992 sitcom called Camp Wilder. Her first film role was in 1994's When a Man Loves a Woman. She subsequently starred in leading roles in the family films Corrina, Corrina and Andre, both of which were released in August 1994. Her next film was the 1995 action film Waterworld, playing a child named Enola.

She played the title role in the 1999 television film Alice in Wonderland. After Alice, she took time off from show business, later saying that she stopped acting so she would not miss out on her childhood: "I wanted to experience the things that a little kid can experience and get to know myself so when I came back I could be tough enough and strong enough to keep a good attitude, keep my head on straight and make the right decisions for myself and my family." She did not appear in another film until the 2004 cult film Napoleon Dynamite. From 2004 onward, she played a recurring role on UPN's series, Veronica Mars, as the computer-savvy Cindy "Mac" Mackenzie. She first appeared in the show's eighth episode, "Like a Virgin", and continued until the show's series finale, "The Bitch is Back". Show creator Rob Thomas created the role with her in mind. She had met Thomas while interviewing him for a report on one of his books. Majorino became a series regular in the show's third and final season. During her time on Veronica Mars, she also started appearing in a recurring role on the cable television series Big Love with Waterworld costar Jeanne Tripplehorn and fellow Veronica Mars cast members Amanda Seyfried and Kyle Gallner. In 2005, she appeared in the music video for the song "Blind" by rock group Lifehouse.

She started filming for The Deep End, a television show for ABC in 2009. She played the role of Addy Fisher, a meek, insecure first-year associate at a high-profile law firm. The show was canceled after only six episodes were aired.

She returned to television in 2011 playing the recurring role of Special Agent Genny Shaw on Bones. She also starred in the music video for "Fuckin' Perfect" by Pink.

In 2012, she reprised her role as Deb in the animated TV version of Napoleon Dynamite. She was also seen playing the role of the vampire Molly in Season 5 of the HBO television series True Blood, an uncredited role as a pregnant woman in the Fox show, Raising Hope, in an episode titled "Tarot Cards," and the role of intern Dr. Heather Brooks in Season 9 of the ABC series Grey's Anatomy, with her character being killed off in the two-part premiere of Season 10. In 2014 she appeared in the Veronica Mars film as her character Mac, a project financed by fans through Kickstarter. Majorino was approached to reprise the role of Mac when Veronica Mars was renewed for a fourth season by Hulu in 2019, but turned it down upon learning the role was essentially a cameo.

Filmography

Film

Television

References

External links

Interview in Stumped? Magazine
@TinaMajorino on Twitter

Living people
20th-century American actresses
21st-century American actresses
Actresses from California
American child actresses
American film actresses
American people of Italian descent
American television actresses
People from Greater Los Angeles
1985 births